Polpochila is a genus of beetles in the family Carabidae, containing the following species:

 Polpochila aguilari Mateu, 2000 
 Polpochila angularis Negre, 1967 
 Polpochila barbata Negre, 1963 
 Polpochila capitata (Chaudoir, 1852) 
 Polpochila chilensis (Chaudoir, 1837) 
 Polpochila darlingtoni Negre, 1963 
 Polpochila erro (Leconte, 1854) 
 Polpochila flavipes (Dejean, 1831)  
 Polpochila hendrichsi Negre, 1967 
 Polpochila impressifrons (Dejean, 1831) 
 Polpochila marginalis Negre, 1963 
 Polpochila minuta Negre, 1963 
 Polpochila monrosi Negre, 1963 
 Polpochila nigra (Gory, 1833) 
 Polpochila pueli Negre, 1963 
 Polpochila reticulata Negre, 1963 
 Polpochila rotundicollis Bates, 1882 
 Polpochila scaritides (Perty, 1830) 
 Polpochila schaumi Negre, 1963 
 Polpochila sulcata Negre, 1963 
 Polpochila venezolana Negre, 1963 
 Polpochila vicina Negre, 1963 
 Polpochila willineri Mateu, 2000

References

Harpalinae